Jan Roos (born 27 January 1977) is a Dutch journalist and former politician and activist.

Career 
Roos worked for the PowNed public broadcasting association, where he made reports for the daily PowNews news program. He also made the radio programme Echte Jannen for PowNed.

Roos used to be a reporter for BNR Nieuwsradio. He later worked for the Dutch self described "politically incorrect" blog GeenStijl.

In 2015 Jan Roos was the campaign leader for GeenPeil, a campaign which got a referendum on the EU-Association Treaty with Ukraine on the books. During this campaign Jan Roos often wore a sailor cap. 

GeenPeil later ran as a political party in the 2017 general election. It failed to gain enough votes to win any seats in the Dutch parliament. Roos campaigned as top candidate of the VoorNederland party, also gaining no seats.

Personal 
Jan Roos is divorced and has three children.

Jan Roos has a criminal conviction for an attack on a 16-year-old boy in 2018 and was fined 750 euro for it. Additionally, he had to pay 700 euro to the victim. The minor suffered a traumatic brain injury, neck pain, mouth bleeding, and a loose front tooth.

References

External links
 
 

1977 births
Living people
Leaders of political parties in the Netherlands
Dutch bloggers
Dutch columnists
Dutch journalists
Dutch atheists
Dutch opinion journalists
Dutch radio presenters
Dutch satirists
Dutch reporters and correspondents
Dutch Internet celebrities
Dutch infotainers
Dutch graphic designers
People from Bergen, North Holland
21st-century Dutch criminals